Liolaemus punmahuida is a species of lizard in the family Iguanidae.  It is found in Argentina.

References

punmahuida
Lizards of South America
Endemic fauna of Argentina
Reptiles of Argentina
Reptiles described in 2003
Taxa named by Luciano Javier Ávila
Taxa named by Mariana Morando